Charles Henry (born 28 September 1986) is an English former footballer. A winger, he is known for his rapid speed, nimble feet and trademark 'double somersault' goal celebrations. He has also represented the England C national football team as a midfielder. Having played for many different clubs Henry may be considered a journeyman.

Club career

Early career
Born in Stevenage, Hertfordshire, Henry began his career with Luton Town as a youngster, but was released at the age of 15, being told by then Luton youth coach Dean Rastrick that he was "too small". He then played local football for Buntingford Town and then Arlesey Town at the age of 17, before signing for Wycombe Wanderers on non-contract terms on 21 November 2005. Released by the Chairboys, Henry signed for Grays Athletic in March 2006.

Haverhill Rovers
Shin splints put an end to his time with Grays and he moved to Haverhill Rovers in July 2006. He scored some vital goals at the Croft ground, helping Haverhill reach the FA Cup Fourth Qualifying Round for the first time in their 125-year history during the 2006–07 campaign, before the minnows finally bowed out to Aldershot Town.

Cambridge City
His form alerted Cambridge City manager Gary Roberts and he was soon thrust into the Lilywhites side where he impressed, bagging 6 goals in 31 appearances. He became something of a crowd favourite at Milton Road with his penetrating runs, powerful shots and wild 'somersault' goal celebrations.

Dorchester Town
Such was his form at Cambridge City, that it alerted the attentions of Dorchester Town, who signed Henry on a two-year contract in July 2007 for a fee of £7,500. With Dorchester having just turned professional, it represented a chance for Henry to play football on a full-time basis.

Havant & Waterlooville
After just three months at the Avenue Stadium, and six goals in 18 appearances, he signed for Havant & Waterlooville on 23 November 2007 for an undisclosed fee.

Newport County
After 16 appearances and 2 goals for the Hawks during the 2007–08 campaign, Henry made a big impact for Havant & Waterlooville during the 2008–09 season, netting 6 goals in just 21 appearances. His form alerted several other clubs and, out-of-contract in the summer of 2009, he eventually signed for Newport County on 18 June 2009, under the management of Dean Holdsworth, on a one-year contract, after scoring several times against the Exiles for his former clubs.

He became a fan favourite at Spytty Park and he fired nine goals in 35 appearances during his first season with the Exiles, the 2009–10 campaign, as Newport won the Conference South title with a record 103 points. On 25 May 2010, Henry signed a new one-year contract with the club.

Playing at Conference Premier level for the first time in his career, Henry was again a key figure for Newport County during the 2010–11 campaign as the Exiles were the surprise package in the league and play-off contenders in the first half of the season.

Luton Town
After scoring at Kenilworth Road for Newport County in a 1–1 draw on 24 August 2010 he was on the radar of Luton manager Richard Money, who had already been impressed with Henry after spotting him in a pre-season match against Stevenage. On 26 November 2010, Henry signed for Luton, initially on loan, before making the move permanent on 5 January 2011, returning to Kenilworth Road nine years after being released as a 15-year-old. Although delighted to be joining Luton Town – an opportunity Henry said was too good to turn down – he did express his sadness at leaving Newport County, saying, "It's very difficult and in a lot of ways I am gutted to be leaving. I've had the best two years of my life down here and the best time in my career by an absolute mile."

Upon returning to Luton, Henry expressed his delight at being given a second opportunity with the Hatters. However, a detached ligament in his foot sustained whilst playing for Newport County proved more serious than initially thought by the Luton Town medical staff, and Henry was sidelined for the remainder of the 2010–11 season with an injury that manager Richard Money described as "one in a million".

Henry eventually made his debut for Luton the next season, coming on as a substitute in the club's 5–1 victory against Hendon in the FA Cup Fourth Qualifying Round on 29 October 2011, 11 months after initially joining the club. Henry described his appearance as "unbelievable" and admitted there were times during his injury where he thought his career was over.

On 24 November 2011, Henry was sent on a two-month loan to League Two side Aldershot Town to build up match fitness. He made six appearances before returning to Luton on 22 January 2012.

Henry made his first league appearance for Luton as a substitute in a 1–1 draw with Darlington on 13 March 2012. He ended the season having played six games for the club, before being released on 30 April.

Macclesfield Town
In 2012 Henry joined Macclesfield Town. On 8 February 2013 he joined A.F.C. Telford United on a one-month loan. On 14 March, Henry decided to terminate his contract with Macclesfield Town after failing to settle in the area.

Team Wellington
In November 2013, Henry made the move to New Zealand to sign for ASB Premiership club Team Wellington, signing a contract in effect until March 2014. He made an immediate impact, scoring on his debut home starting appearance in a 3–1 defeat of Southern United on 24 November 2013. He went on to score regularly, taking his tally of goals to six in eleven appearances when netting twice in a 6–1 victory over Hawke's Bay United on 2 February 2014.

Dunstable Town
After a stint in New Zealand's ASB Premiership for Team Wellington, Henry signed for Dunstable Town in the summer of 2014 following their promotion for the Southern Premier Division.

International career
Henry's form with Newport County in 2010 earned him a call-up in the England C national football team, where he made his debut in a 2–2 draw with Wales. A month later, he earned his second cap, picking up the man-of-the-match award in a 1–0 victory over Estonia U23 in Tallinn in the International Challenge Trophy.

Honours

Club
Newport County
 Conference South: 2009–10

References

External links
 

1986 births
Living people
People from Stevenage
Footballers from Hertfordshire
English footballers
England semi-pro international footballers
Association football midfielders
Arlesey Town F.C. players
Wycombe Wanderers F.C. players
Grays Athletic F.C. players
Haverhill Rovers F.C. players
Cambridge City F.C. players
Dorchester Town F.C. players
Havant & Waterlooville F.C. players
Newport County A.F.C. players
Luton Town F.C. players
Aldershot Town F.C. players
Macclesfield Town F.C. players
AFC Telford United players
Whitehawk F.C. players
Chelmsford City F.C. players
Team Wellington players
Dunstable Town F.C. players
English Football League players
National League (English football) players